Kulveer Singh Ranger  (Punjabi: ਕਲਵੀਰ ਸਿੰਘ ਰੇਂਜਰ) (born 1975) is an English strategy and communications executive and TechUK board member.

Career 
Ranger became a well known name after he was head hunted to become the Director for Transport Policy by Boris Johnson after Johnson won the Mayoral election in May 2008. His previous experience in implementing the Oyster card system for London was key in him becoming selected by Johnson.

In 2011, Ranger became the Director for Environment and Digital London and his work resulted in a record fall in bike thefts in addition to a number of new electric car charging points in London to encourage a higher take up of electric vehicles.

He is currently talks on digital transformation and works as a management consultant. He is also a special adviser to UK government on digital strategy.

Ranger was on the long list to be the Conservative party candidate for the 2021 London mayoral election.

Family and early life
Ranger is a Sikh, born in Hammersmith in West London, the son of Indian parents. His grandfather Gurnam Singh Sahni set up the first British Asian newspaper The Punjab Times in the mid-sixties.

Ranger gained an honours degree in architecture from University College London. He also has a business diploma from Kingston Business School.

See also 
 List of British Sikhs

References

English Sikhs
Alumni of University College London
Conservative Party (UK) politicians
Living people
1975 births
British politicians of Indian descent